Tamo daleko is a Serbian folk song which was composed on the Greek island of Corfu in 1916 to commemorate the Serbian Army's retreat through Albania during World War I. It is played in triple metre and begins solemnly in a minor key before switching to the relative major of the dominant key in the third line of the first verse, symbolizing hope before returning to the tonic minor key from the beginning. The lyrics to the song come in multiple versions, all of which end with the line "long live Serbia!"

The song became very popular amongst Serbian émigrés following World War I and was even played on the violin at Serb inventor Nikola Tesla's funeral in January 1943.  A symbol of Serbian culture and national identity, it came to be viewed as a form of national anthem in the Serbian diaspora during the Cold War, and some of its lyrics were prohibited alongside several other songs in Titoist Yugoslavia because they evoked the resurgence of Serbian national feeling. The identity of its writer and composer remained a matter of dispute for many decades. In 2008, historian Ranko Jakovljević discovered that Đorđe Marinković, an amateur musician from the village of Korbovo near Kladovo, was the song's original writer and composer, having composed the song in 1916 and secured its authorship rights in Paris in 1922. The song remains popular amongst Serbs in the Balkans and the diaspora.

History

Background
During World War I, the Serbian Army retreated through Albania after the Central Powers invaded the Kingdom of Serbia during the winter of 1915. The Serbian Army was devastated by hunger, disease and attacks by armed bands before regrouping on the Greek island of Corfu, where many more Serbian soldiers died. Fatalities were buried at sea and surviving Serbian soldiers named those waters "the Blue Graveyard".

Song

Tamo daleko is a Serbian folk song. Composed in 1916, it commemorates the retreat of the Serbian Army to Corfu and revolves around the theme of loss and longing for a distant homeland. It is played in triple metre and begins solemnly in a minor key before switching to the relative major of the dominant key in the third line of the first verse, symbolizing hope before returning to the tonic minor key from the beginning. The singer describes himself as being from the land "where the lemon tree blooms yellow" and looks "far away in the distance, where the sun shines brighter" to the village where he was born. Most versions of the song end with the line "long live Serbia!".

In April 1917, a Serbian American group named Tamburaško Pevačko Društvo made a recording of the song. Towards the end of World War I, the Serbian Army retook Serbia from Austria-Hungary and Bulgaria. Tamo daleko became very popular amongst Serbian émigrés. The song was even played at the funeral of the Serbian inventor Nikola Tesla in New York City in January 1943. In Titoist Yugoslavia, it was performed by Dušan Jakšić (1965), Nikola Vučetin Bata (1977) and others, but usually without the lines explicitly mentioning Serbia. From around 1985, lyrics mentioning Serbia and the Serbian Army appear again in official releases of the song in Yugoslavia.

Historian Andrej Mitrović writes of the song's "nostalgic air [and] sorrowful melody". He argues that it provides great insight into the collective psychology and overall morale of the Serbian Army during the winter of 1915. He asserts that while the song is nostalgic, the basic idea is one of optimism. Journalist Roger Cohen describes Tamo daleko as "the lament of a people uprooted". The author Robert Hudson writes that "a sense of primordial identity, linked to family and nation, is embedded in [the] song, with father and son giving up their lives for the nation". Author Eric Gordy describes it as one of the most recognizable Serbian nationalist songs. During the Cold War, Serbs in the diaspora began viewing it as a form of national anthem. The song was as significant as the March on the Drina in the history of Serbian music. It became a powerful symbol of Serbian culture and national identity. In 1964, it was featured in the Bulgarian film The Peach Thief. In the early 1990s Radio Television of Serbia broadcast a documentary showing Serbian veterans returning to Corfu, with Tamo daleko playing gently in the background. Many variations of the song were sung by Bosnian Serb volunteers during the Bosnian War. The song remains popular amongst Serbs in the Balkans and the diaspora and several modern versions of it have been recorded, most notably by musician Goran Bregović.

Authorship
The identity of the song's writer and composer remained unknown for many decades. Several individuals claimed to have been its original authors. Some contended that Milan Buzin, the chaplain of the Drina Division, had composed and written the song. Others claimed that Dimitrije Marić, the surgeon of the Third field hospital of the Šumadija Division, was the composer. Mihailo Zastavniković, a teacher from Negotin, was also rumoured to have been the original composer and writer and had even published one version of the song in 1926. 

In 2008, historian Ranko Jakovljević discovered that Đorđe Marinković, an amateur musician from the village of Korbovo near Kladovo, was the song's original writer and composer. He composed Tamo daleko in Corfu in 1916 and moved to Paris after World War I, where he secured the authorship rights to the song in 1922. He lived in relative obscurity until his death in 1977.

Lyrics
There are multiple versions of Tamo daleko in existence. A common version goes as follows:

Yugoslav Partisan version

During World War II the Communist-led Yugoslav Partisans also sung a version of the song, dedicated to the Yugoslav People's Army and Josip Broz Tito:

Covers
 Dort in der Ferne by Eugen Cicero

Citations

Notes

Footnotes

References

External links
  Tamo daleko- Opus Djordja Marinkovica

Serbian patriotic songs
Serbian culture
Culture of Republika Srpska
History of Corfu
Serbia in World War I
Greece in World War I
1916 in Serbia
1916 songs
Songs about Serbia
Songs of World War I
Cultural depictions of Serbian men